BD1060 or N-[2-(3,4-dichlorophenyl)ethyl]-1-pyrrolidineethanamine is a selective sigma receptor antagonist, with a reported binding affinity of Ki = 3 ± 0.1 nM for the sigma-1 receptor and greater than 50 times selectivity over the sigma-2 receptor.

Like other sigma receptor antagonists, pretreating Swiss Webster mice with BD1060 significantly reduces the behavioral toxicity of cocaine.

See also
 BD1008
 BD1031
 LR132

References

Sigma antagonists